Leyland Bus was a British bus and train manufacturer.  It emerged from the Rover Group (formerly British Leyland) as a management buyout of the bus business.  It was subsequently acquired by Volvo Buses in 1988 and the Leyland name disappeared in 1993.

History 
 1896 Formed as the Lancashire Steam Motor Company.
 1907 Name changed to Leyland Motors.
 1968 Merger with British Motor Holdings to form British Leyland Motor Corporation (BLMC).
 1975 BLMC was nationalised and became British Leyland (BL).
 1986 BL changed its name to Rover Group.
 1987 The bus business of Rover Group became independent as Leyland Bus following a management buyout.
 1988 The business was acquired by Volvo Buses.
 1993 Volvo discontinues Leyland ending all production of the buses and the Workington factory, where they were built.

See also 
 List of Leyland buses
 Ashok Leyland
 Leyland Trucks

References 
 
 

Defunct bus manufacturers of the United Kingdom
Leyland buses